Dario Alioto (born 1984) is a professional poker player from Palermo, Italy. Alioto's first major success in poker came at the European Poker Tour 2005 Barcellona main event, where he finished in 7th place and earned €52,000. Right after this score, he started grinding PLO cash games that became his best poker game, rapidly becoming one of the best Italian professional players. Later on in his career, he won his first World Series of Poker bracelet in the £5,000 Pot Limit Omaha event at the 2007 World Series of Poker Europe. Alioto earned £234,390 for his finish. He has also had success at the 2008 World Series of Poker, where he has earned over $230,000 from four cashes. A well-respected cash game player online and live, he played most of the many televised Italian high-stakes cash games in the last few years.
He now plays a wide variety of games and is now considered one of the best all-around players in Europe.

In 2009, Alioto has been the captain of the Sisal Poker Team Pro, which was voted the #1 Team Pro in Italy for 2009 and 2010.

Poker career 

Alioto made his first career WSOP cash at the $1,500 PLO/8 event, scoring a Final Table with a 6th-place finish and earning $33,759, after one week cashed at the 10k PLO WSOP World Championship for $22,137.

At the 2008 WSOP, event 34 (PL Omaha $1,500) came 4th, cashing $180,534  and came 19th at the WSOP PLO World Championship for $28,651, cashed two more times the same year, finishing 9th and 12th on 2-7 Lowball events.

At the 2009 WSOP in the Event #5 (1,500 PLO)  - the biggest PLO field of all time - came 7th at the Final Table, collecting $29,881. Still the same year at the event #42 (WSOP Mixed Event $2500) scored his 5th WSOP FT with an 8th place, cashing $25,860.

Won a side event EPT Title (Pot Limit Omaha hi/low, 2009) in London, at the biggest PLO/8  - 1000 Pound buy-in - ever held in Europe for this game. Won one more title at Prague's Ept at the €1,000  NL Holdem/ PL Omaha  mixed, in December 2010.

Team Italy's Captain at the last three editions of European Nation's Cup, leading his team to the runner-up place 2008 and 9th place in 2009 and in 2010 missed again the chance to become European Champion with his Team (Sisalpoker Team Pro) running up against title winner Finland of Juha Helpi.

At the 2011 WSOP, at the PLO 10k$ World Championships came 5th, collecting $204,113

At the 2013 WSOP, at the 2,5k Mixed 8-Games scored his second career 8-Game Final Table coming 6th, collecting $35,634

Other records 

 Leads the European Omaha all time money list, that ranks all the Omaha tournament scores in Europe of all times, putting him as the most winning tournament PLO player ever in Europe.
 Best Pot Limit Omaha (PLO/8) performer at the WSOP (Years 2007–09), scoring 6 ITM finishes, with 4 Final Tables and 1 Bracelet's winning.
 Ranked 4th in the WSOP Omaha All time money list.
 Most winning Italian player ever on non-Holdem tournaments.
 First Italian ever to score both WSOP and EPT Final Tables.
 Holds the record ( seven ) of most WSOP Final Table finishes in Italy.
 Youngest Italian to ever win a WSOP bracelet.
 First Italian at the 2011 Wsop money list
 Winner of the EPT Omaha Award rankings for season 7, second place for the Mixed games ranking and fifth for the overall 
 Ept side events scores, seasons 6 and 7:
 Titles: 2 (Pot Limi Omaha Hi/Low London 2009 and Mixed NL Holdem-Pot Limi Omaha Prague 2010)
 Final Tables: 15
 Cashes: 17
 As of August 2013, his total live tournament winnings exceed $1,531,440.

Money winnings 

Source:. All values in USD$.

World Series of Poker bracelets 

An "E" following a year denotes bracelet(s) won at the World Series of Poker Europe

References 

Italian poker players
Living people
World Series of Poker bracelet winners
1984 births